Meri Shadi Karao is a 2013 Hindi Bollywood comedy film directed by Syed Noor and produced by Daler Mehndi, under "Mehndi Production" and "Paragon Entertainment Group" banners. Gurdeep Mehndi, Radhika Vaid and Manoj Pahwa in lead role.

Cast
 Gurdeep Mehndi.... Gurdeep
 Radhika Vaid.... Radhika
 Manoj Pahwa.... Kalyan
 Nikki Mehndi.... Preetam
 Sakhawat Naz
 Umar
 Ravinder Paul
 Tahir Naushad

Soundtrack
 "Tenu Ki" - Gurdeep Mehndi
 "Jean Shean Pake" - Gurdeep Mehndi, Rap By – Arya
 "Meri Shadi Karao" - Daler Mehndi
 "Dil Ne Mana" - Gurdeep Mehndi, Rap By – Gora Singh
 "Dil Vil Ke" - Gurdeep Mehndi
 "Naina" - Harjeet Mehndi
 "Guru Ramdas Rakho Sharnai" - Kishan Pal

Critical reception
Renuka Vyavahare of Times of India gave 1.5 out of 5 stars and quoted, "The music of the film is decent. While the film isn't revolting or something equally bad, there's nothing much for you to get entertained by either. The film could have probably been better, had it been in Punjabi."

References

Indian comedy films